Shevon Nieto (née Stoddart; born 21 November 1982) is a former Jamaican hurdler.

She won the bronze medal at the 2005 Central American and Caribbean Championships and finished fifth at the 2006 Commonwealth Games. At the 2006 Central American and Caribbean Games she won a silver medal in 4x400 metres relay.

She also competed at the 2004 Olympic Games and the 2005 World Championships without reaching the final.

She made her 2nd Olympic team in 2008  held in Beijing, China and represented Jamaica in the 400 hurdles. In 2015, she made her 3rd World Championship team in Beijing, China representing Jamaica in the 400 hurdles. Her personal best time is 54.47 seconds, achieved in June 2005 in Sacramento.

She attended the University of South Carolina on a track scholarship.

Shevon is also a singer and participant in the Art of the Olympians. In 2017, she married Olympic high jumper Jamie Nieto, who suffered a serious injury during a coaching mishap, leaving him partially paralyzed. In 2020, she sang an original song dedicated to her husband on America's Got Talent.

Personal bests

Competition record

References

External links

Sports reference biography

1982 births
Living people
Jamaican female hurdlers
Athletes (track and field) at the 2004 Summer Olympics
Athletes (track and field) at the 2008 Summer Olympics
Olympic athletes of Jamaica
Athletes (track and field) at the 2006 Commonwealth Games
South Carolina Gamecocks women's track and field athletes
World Athletics Championships athletes for Jamaica
Central American and Caribbean Games silver medalists for Jamaica
Competitors at the 2006 Central American and Caribbean Games
America's Got Talent contestants
21st-century Jamaican women singers
Central American and Caribbean Games medalists in athletics
Commonwealth Games competitors for Jamaica
Athletes (track and field) at the 2007 Pan American Games
Pan American Games competitors for Jamaica